Portmore United Football Club is a Jamaican football team in the top flight Jamaica National Premier League.

The team trains and plays home matches at the Prison Oval.

History

Hazard United
The club was formed as Hazard United and has been around for more than 20 years. They started out in the Clarendon League in Division 2, then played two years in Division 1 when they qualified for Craven A Premier League. They have been in Jamaica National Premier League ever since. Hazard United were based in May Pen and won two league titles (1993 and 2003).

Move to Portmore and rebranding as Portmore United
Portmore United was founded in the late 20th century in Hazard as Hazard United. In the early 21st century, the club moved to Clarendon and renamed itself to honor its Clarendon home. JFF regulations stipulated that each club have stands with seating capacity of at least 1,500 persons, which Clarendon did not have. In order to honor this requirement, the team subsequently moved to St. Catherine and began to use the Ferdi Neita Sports Complex. Initially, Clarendon and the St. Catherine football club agreed to share the same stadium. However, in 2002, St. Catherine suggested Clarendon change its affiliation to become a St. Catherine team. However, due to an anaemic growth rate in support due to a club name which was not locally identifiable, Clarendon instead chose to move to Portmore and rebrand itself as Portmore United.  The club has won four (4) Premier League titles since it relocated to the Portmore community.

The club also has teams in youth divisions, including Under 20, Under 17, Under 15, and Under 13. A number of players from these teams have been capped with their respective Jamaica national teams.  

In October 2008, Portmore were stunned as technical director Donovan Duckie quit the club for personal reasons. Duckie had only recently succeeded Horace Reid in August 2008 after Portmore won the league title. The team’s current management staff includes Andre Waugh as technical director and joint head coaches Geoffrey Hewitt and Linval Dixon.

Honours

Official trophies (recognized by CONCACAF and FIFA)

National
Jamaica National Premier League: 7
1993, 2003, 2005, 2008, 2012, 2017–18, 2018–19

JFF Champions Cup: 4
2000, 2003, 2005, 2007

International
CFU Club Championship: 2
2005, 2019

Current squad
2019/20 season

Out on loan

Former players

  Christopher Nicholas
  Allien Whittaker

Former coaches
 Leebert Halliman
 Horace Reid
 Bradley Stewart
 Lenworth Hyde sr.
 Donovan Duckie
 Neville Bell
 Calvin Lewis
 Andre Waugh
 Paul Young (2005–07)
 Linval Dixon (2007–09), (2010)
 Shavar Thomas (2017–19)

References

External links
 Team profile at Golocaljamaica
 Portmore captures End-of-Round final – Jamaica Observer
 Portmore ready for more in RPL – Jamaica Gleaner

Football clubs in Jamaica
Association football clubs established in 2003
2003 establishments in Jamaica
Association football clubs established in 1985
1985 establishments in Jamaica